Saint-Rambert-en-Bugey (literally Saint-Rambert in Bugey) is a commune in the Ain department in eastern France.

History
The commune takes its name from St Rambert (or Ragnebert) who was assassinated here in the 7th century. The site soon became popular for pilgrimage and an influential abbey was built in the town.

Geography
The river Albarine flows southwest through the commune. Saint-Rambert-en-Bugey station has rail connections to Lyon, Ambérieu-en-Bugey and Chambéry.

Climate
Saint-Rambert-en-Bugey has a oceanic climate (Köppen climate classification Cfb).

Population

See also
Communes of the Ain department

References

External links

  Office de Tourism in Saint-Rambert-en-Bugey
 Saint-Rambert pictures

Communes of Ain
Ain communes articles needing translation from French Wikipedia